Louise Kelley Frisbie (1913–1989) was a newspaper columnist, author, historian and educator. She was born in Jacksonville, Florida in 1913 and moved to Bartow, Florida in 1935 after graduating from Florida Southern College. She worked at Summerlin Institute (now Bartow High School) for three years before joining the Polk County Democrat, where her husband worked.

She wrote a series of articles on Fort Meade a column titled "Pioneers". Following up on the popular column she wrote three books: Peace River Pioneers, Yesterday's Polk County and Florida's Fabled Inns.

Governor Reubin Askew appointed her to the Polk County Historical Commission in 1972, and she continued there for 16 years. She was a founding member of the Polk County Historical Association and was the group's first editor. She was honored by the Florida Senate for her work in preserving local history in 1976. Frisbie died in 1989. She was designated a Great Floridian in 2000 and a plaque honoring her is located at the Polk County Democrat Building at  190 South Florida Avenue in Bartow.

References

1913 births
1989 deaths
American columnists
Florida Southern College alumni
Writers from Jacksonville, Florida
People from Bartow, Florida
Historians of Florida
American women historians
American women columnists
20th-century American women writers
20th-century American historians
History of Polk County, Florida
Historians from Florida